Rhodoglobus vestalii is a Gram-positive and psychrophilic bacterium from the genus Rhodoglobus which has been isolated from a dry Valley lake near the McMurdo Ice Shelf from the Antarctica.

References

Microbacteriaceae
Bacteria described in 2003